Richard Dewhurst (May 26, 1826October 13, 1895) was an English American immigrant, lawyer, judge, businessman, and politician. He served in the Wisconsin State Assembly for four non-consecutive terms over four different decades (from the 1850s to the 1880s) under four different political party labels (Republican, Union, Liberal Reform and Independent); and was defeated twice when running for election on the ticket of a fifth party, the Democratic.

Background 
Dewhurst was born near Manchester, England, on May 26, 1826; at the age of one year he came to the United States when his parents moved there, settling first in Bristol County, Massachusetts, then moving to Lorain County, Ohio, where they would spend the remainder of their lives, and where three more sons were born to them. Dewhurst spent a part of his boyhood and youth on his parents' farm, received a common school and academic education in Elyria, Ohio, subsequently read the law in the Oberlin, Ohio office of one P. Bliss. He was admitted to the bar of Ohio, and in 1850 moved to Jo Daviess County, Illinois, where for a while he worked in the lead mines. For a year or two he taught school in Scales Mound, Illinois, then moved about 1852 to Potosi in Grant County, Wisconsin.

Public office and employment; first term in the Assembly; marriage and move; Civil War 
By 1854 he was teaching school in Platteville, and in 1856 was admitted to the bar of Wisconsin at White Oak Springs, before moving on to Weston in May of that year. In 1856 he was elected Clark County's county judge, and register of deeds. In 1858, he was first elected a member of the Assembly for a one-year term in the Legislature's 12th (1859) session as a member of the newly organized Republican Party, succeeding fellow Republican Lucius Cannon in the district encompassing Chippewa, Clark, Dunn and Pierce counties. He was succeeded by William P. Bartlett (also a Republican). 
On March 29, 1859 he married Maria S. Curtis, who had been born in Ohio on April 9, 1840 (her parents, both natives of Connecticut, were married in Ohio and had settled at Cottage Grove, Wisconsin). After marriage the Dewhursts came to Neillsville, settling on the bank of the creek below the mill. The nearest markets were then at Sparta and La Crosse, and the roads merely trails through the wilderness. They built a frame house, and there they began domestic life. Dewhurst engaged in logging, a widespread occupation in that region in those days. It was later remembered that there were still many American Indians in the area who often came to the Dewhurst home looking for handouts, and "were always given something."

During the American Civil War Dewhurst served in a Wisconsin regiment and served as a deputy U. S. assessor in 1863-4.

Second term in the Assembly 
He was elected again in 1864 as a National Union candidate, to a district which now encompassed Clark and Jackson counties, succeeding Calvin R. Johnson (also a National Union candidate), and was assigned to the standing committees on banks and banking, and on school and university lands. His profession is described as land agent in the Wisconsin Blue Book for that term He was succeeded by yet another Union candidate, Leandor Merrill.

After the second term; 1870s and beyond 
He was elected again to the Assembly in 1874 as a candidate of the Liberal Reform Party (also called the Democratic Reform or simply Reform Party), a short-lived coalition of Democrats, reform and Liberal Republicans, and Grangers formed in 1873. He was the Reform nominee both for the 32nd Senate District, losing 2097 to 2354 to Republican Robert C. Field; and for his old Assembly district (Clark and Jackson Counties), defeating Republican James Hewett 1210 to 1179. With the Reform coalition starting to break down (Reform Governor William Robert Taylor, the heart of the party, was defeated for re-election), Dewhurst was not a candidate for re-election in 1875, and was succeeded by Republican Hugh B. Mills.

In 1875, he became county school superintendent; and upon the death of incumbent William Hutchinson he filled Hutchinson's unexpired term as county treasurer. In 1877 he once again became county judge, serving until 1879.

During this period he built a colonial home in Neillsville, and a block on the town's Main Street bearing his name. In 1874 Dewhurst travelled to Oregon, Washington and California, and in the late 1870s toured Scotland, Ireland, his native England and the French Exposition.

He ran for the Assembly again in 1884 as a Democrat (Clark County now had its own Assembly district), losing to Republican James O'Neill (the younger) with 1515 votes to O'Neill's 1831. He was elected as a member of the assembly for the fourth and final time in 1886 as an independent candidate, receiving 1,601 votes, against 1,019 votes for Republican T. J. La Flesh and 200 for Prohibitionist George A. Austin (O'Neill was not a candidate). This time, he was assigned to the committee on town and county organizations. He ran for re-election as a Democrat, and was defeated by Republican Merritt Clarke Ring.

Personal life 
At the time of his death Dewhurst was president of the Neillsville Bank and held a like position in the German American Bank of Marshfield. He was a Mason and a member of the Universalist Church. He died of apoplexy on October 13, 1895 while visiting the Cotton States and International Exposition in Atlanta, Georgia; He'd left Neillsville for Atlanta on September 30, intending to spend some days at the Exposition and then proceed to his winter home in Florida.

The Town of Dewhurst, Wisconsin, was named after him in 1901.

References

External links
Town of Dewhurst, Wisconsin

American bankers
American loggers
American miners
Schoolteachers from Wisconsin
American Universalists
Businesspeople from Wisconsin
County officials in Wisconsin
English emigrants to the United States
Members of the Wisconsin State Assembly
People from Neillsville, Wisconsin
People of Wisconsin in the American Civil War
Wisconsin Democrats
Wisconsin Independents
Wisconsin state court judges
Wisconsin lawyers
Wisconsin Reformers (19th century)
19th-century American politicians
Wisconsin Republicans
1826 births
1895 deaths
19th-century English people
American lawyers admitted to the practice of law by reading law
19th-century American businesspeople
19th-century American judges
19th-century American lawyers
19th-century American educators